The Colombian Social Democratic Party (Partido Socialdemócrata Colombiano) is a political party (centre-left) in Colombia. 

Social democracy is a political ideology that supports economic and social interventions to promote social justice within the framework of a capitalist economy, and a policy regime involving welfare state provisions, collective bargaining arrangements, regulation of the economy in the general interest, redistribution of income and wealth, and a commitment to representative democracy.

In the 2002 legislative elections, the party was one of the many small parties to achieve parliamentary representation.

See also
Social democracy
Political parties in Colombia
Social democratic parties in Colombia